Stéphane Mangione (born 25 December 1979 in Chenôve) is a retired French football player who played as a left winger. He is currently assistant coach at Sochaux.

Career
Mangione has long been a servant of hometown club Dijon FC in fourth, then third and finally second tier of French football. He spent a decade at the club with the exception of the 2003–04 season, when he was on loan at Nîmes Olympique. On 10 November 2009, Mangione signed with Amiens SC in third tier on a free transfer, where he played for two seasons.

He then had a two years stint at US Orléans in third tier and finally three seasons at Selongey in fifth tier of French football where he finally took a position of assistant manager.

Honours
Dijon FCO
 Champion at Championnat de France amateur: 1999
 Champion at Championnat National: 2000

References

External links
 
 

1979 births
Living people
French footballers
Amiens SC players
Dijon FCO players
Nîmes Olympique players
Valenciennes FC players
US Orléans players
SC Selongey players
Association football defenders